Tomislav Slavchev Pavlov (born 10 June 1991) is a Bulgarian footballer who plays as a midfielder for Sportist Svoge.

Career

Early career
Pavlov began his career at CSKA Sofia. At the age of 15 he was scouted by Scottish side Celtic whom he signed for in March 2007 . After spending two years of his career in Celtic youth team, on 2 August 2009, he returned to his old club, despite an offer from the Glasgow side. Pavlov played six months for the reserve squad of CSKA, before moving to Minyor Pernik in January 2010.

Minyor Pernik
In January 2010 Pavlov was invited by Minyor Pernik . He made his team debut a few days later in a 1–0 friendly win against Pirin Gotse Delchev. After the match Pavlov signed a -year contract with the club.

CSKA 1948
On 11 August 2017, Pavlov signed with CSKA 1948.

Career statistics

Club

References

External links

1991 births
Living people
Sportspeople from Pernik
Bulgarian footballers
Bulgaria youth international footballers
Association football midfielders
First Professional Football League (Bulgaria) players
Celtic F.C. players
PFC CSKA Sofia players
PFC Minyor Pernik players
OFC Pirin Blagoevgrad players
PFC Marek Dupnitsa players
FC CSKA 1948 Sofia players
FC Lokomotiv 1929 Sofia players
FC Sportist Svoge players